Lu Zheyu (born 8 September 1989) is a Chinese footballer who plays as a goalkeeper for Chinese club Tianjin Fusheng.

Club career
Lu Zheyu was born in Tianjin and would join his local football club Tianjin TEDA where he broke into the senior team within the 2010 Chinese Super League season before he was loaned out to fellow top tier club Jiangsu Sainty as their third choice goalkeeper throughout the second half of the league campaign. After several further loan spells, Lu left Tianjin TEDA and joined Baoding Yingli ETS on a permanent basis.

Career statistics

Notes

References

External links

1989 births
Living people
Chinese footballers
Association football goalkeepers
Chinese Super League players
China League One players
China League Two players
Tianjin Jinmen Tiger F.C. players
Jiangsu F.C. players
Baoding Yingli Yitong players